Sunamganj-2 is a constituency represented in the Jatiya Sangsad (National Parliament) of Bangladesh since 2017 by Joya Sengupta of the Awami League.

Boundaries 
The constituency encompasses Derai and Sullah upazilas.

History 
The constituency was created in 1984 from the Sylhet-2 constituency when the former Sylhet District was split into four districts: Sunamganj, Sylhet, Moulvibazar, and Habiganj.

Members of Parliament

Elections 
Suranjit Sengupta died in February 2017. Joya Sengupta, his widow, was elected in a March 2017 by-election.

Suranjit Sengupta was elected unopposed in the 2014 general election after opposition parties withdrew their candidacies in a boycott of the election.

Elections in the 2000s

Elections in the 1990s

References

External links
 

Parliamentary constituencies in Bangladesh
Sunamganj District